Jordan Ferri (born 12 March 1992) is a French professional footballer who plays as a midfielder for Montpellier. He principally plays as a defensive midfielder and is known for his passing ability.

Career
Ferri made his debut in the Europa League on 8 November 2012 against Athletic Bilbao, replacing  Alexandre Lacazette in the 82nd minute. He made his league debut on 12 December against AS Nancy, replacing Anthony Réveillère after 30 minutes. On 22 November 2018, Ferri joined fellow Ligue 1 side Nîmes on loan until the end of the season.
At the beginning of the 2019–2020 season, Ferri joined  Montpellier.

Career statistics

Honours
Lyon
Trophée des Champions: 2012

References

External links
 
 
 

Living people
1992 births
People from Cavaillon
Sportspeople from Vaucluse
French footballers
Footballers from Provence-Alpes-Côte d'Azur
Association football midfielders
France under-21 international footballers
France youth international footballers
Ligue 1 players
Olympique Lyonnais players
Nîmes Olympique players
Montpellier HSC players